Louis W. Blessing III (born November 11, 1980) is a Republican member of the Ohio Senate for the 8th district, and a former member of the Ohio House of Representatives for the 29th District. He is the son of Lou Blessing, who previously served in the Ohio Senate and the Ohio House of Representatives, before he was forced to step down due to term limits.

Early life, education, and pre-political career
Blessing was born in 1980 in Cincinnati, Ohio, the son of Louis William and Linda Ann (née Lameier) Blessing Jr. He graduated from La Salle High School in Cincinnati in 1999, and then from the University of Cincinnati in 2003, earning a B.A. in Mathematics. He later went on to obtain a B.S. degree in electrical engineering from the University of Cincinnati in 2007.

As a practicing engineer, Blessing earned his professional engineer's license in 2011.

Ohio General Assembly

Ohio House of Representatives

Energy 
In 2017 Blessing introduced H.B. 114, legislation aimed at reducing energy efficiency mandates and eliminating renewable energy mandates in Ohio. The bill passed the House with bipartisan support.

Banking and Finance 
In 2017 Blessing introduced H.B. 199. This legislation created the Ohio Residential Mortgage Lending Act for the purpose of regulating all non-depository lending secured by residential real estate, limited the application of the current Mortgage Loan Law to unsecured loans and loans secured by other than residential real estate, and modified an exemption to the Ohio Consumer Installment Loan Act.

Heroin epidemic 
Along with Representative Jonathan Dever, Blessing jointly sponsored H.B. 171 in the 131st General Assembly. The legislation sought to get drug dealers off of the streets by decreasing the minimum amount of heroin to be considered a first-degree felony trafficking violation.

Education 
In 2015, Representatives Blessing and Jeff Rezabek jointly sponsored H.B. 299. The legislation allows children who are with a legal, permanent or temporary custodian to apply for one of the state's Autism Scholarships. A constituent in Blessing's district, who is the legal guardian of a young girl with Autism, had lost the Autism scholarship. The legislation was ultimately passed and signed by governor John Kasich.

Alcohol 
Blessing, with fellow Cincinnati Representative Denise Driehaus, introduced H.B. 47, which sought to establish "outdoor refreshment areas": areas designated by local governments that allow for open containers.

In the 132nd General Assembly, Blessing sponsored H.B. 444, which allowed free sampling of alcohol beverages in restaurants.

Ohio Senate 
Blessing entered the Ohio Senate on October 9, 2019, after the retirement of his predecessor Louis Terhar.

Committee assignments 
During the 14th General Assembly, Blessing was assigned to the following Ohio Senate committees:

 (Chair of) Ways & Means Committee
 (Vice Chair of) Primary & Secondary Education Committee
 Finance Committee
 Transportation Committee

Electoral history

Personal life
Blessing and his wife Heather have two children: Louis William Blessing IV and James Warner Blessing.

References

External links

Living people
Republican Party members of the Ohio House of Representatives
University of Cincinnati alumni
Place of birth missing (living people)
21st-century American politicians
1980 births
Republican Party Ohio state senators